

Paul Danhauser (2 August 1892 – 11 December 1975) was a general in the Wehrmacht of Nazi Germany during World War II. He was a recipient of the Knight's Cross of the Iron Cross.

Awards 

 Knight's Cross of the Iron Cross on 10 February 1942 as Oberst and commander of Infanterie-Regiment 427

References

Citations

Bibliography

 

1892 births
1975 deaths
Military personnel from Regensburg
People from the Kingdom of Bavaria
German Army personnel of World War I
Military personnel of Bavaria
Recipients of the clasp to the Iron Cross, 1st class
Recipients of the Gold German Cross
Recipients of the Knight's Cross of the Iron Cross
German prisoners of war in World War II held by the United States
Lieutenant generals of the German Army (Wehrmacht)